Ukrainian Universal Exchange  (UUE) — Ukrainian company, commodity exchange, which is represented in several regions of Ukraine. June 2015 - the largest exchange in Ukraine.

History 
The Exchange was established on October 7, 1997 with the aim of taking an active part in market transformation of economy of Ukraine and is one of the first professional organizations in Ukraine, which began to provide a full range of exchange services.

2004 — by the decree of the CMU "On granting of powers for the implementation of the decommissioned military property of the Armed Forces" dated 13.12.2004, No. 894-p, the exchange has the authority to implement written off military property of the Armed Forces.

2011 — received a license to conduct land trades — series АГ № 583015 dated 14.01.2011 for the sale of land and lease rights.
2012 — by the results of the competition held by the State Taxation Administration, UUE is added to the list of authorized exchanges which can conclude contracts with the Taxation Administration on sale of the taxpayer’s property which is being in the tax lien (STA letter dated 05.01.2012 № 261/6/19-9015 ).

2012 — this year the UUE is one of 4 exchanges authorized by the Ministry of Economic Development regarding the electronic exchange trading on sale of coal products according to the results of the contest.

2013 — contract No. 365 dated 22.10.2013 with The State Property Fund of Ukraine on sale of property in state and communal property..

2014 — by the results of the competition by The State Property Fund of Ukraine, the UUE recognized as the winner in managing auctions on disposal of state property objects.

2014 — receive a Certificate of assessment activity No. 16049/14 by The State Property Fund of Ukraine.

2014 — UUE determined as the winner and the sole organizer of spot trades on sale of Crude oil, gas condensate and liquefied gas production by state-owned companies.

2014 — UUE became a member of the Association of exchanges and electronic platform.

2015 — by the decision of the DGF Executive Directorate No. 005/15 — UUE was included in the list of enterprises which have the right to provide services by persons authorized by the Fund in the removal of insolvent Banks from the market or liquidation of the Bank.

Activity area of the company 

The main activity areas of the Exchange are:
 organization and holding exchange and  open trades (Auctions) on:
 sale of crude oil, gas condensate of equity production and liquefied gas, including for the population needs;
 sales of state and municipal property, state-owned and registered of organizers of the auctions for the disposal of state property (cooperation with the authorities of the privatization of Ukraine, ministries and departments, local governments at all levels);
 sale of taxpayer’s assets in tax lien;
 sale of land parcels and lease rights;
 sales of unprocessed timber;
 sales of military surplus and decommissioned assets;
 sale of confiscated and abandoned property (which became the property of the state);
 sales of wholesale products of Ukrainian enterprises;
 sale of fixed assets (sale of illiquid assets, scrap and surplus property, are not considered fixed assets (Inventory);
 sale of property of bankrupt enterprises at all stages;
 sale of bank collateral, determining the value of a property, search of potential clients;
 Registering of internal and international contracts for the export of agricultural products.
 Grain trade. One of the market makers on this market is the Agrarian Fund of Ukraine.
 Conducting market research to determine demand and supply, the pricing policy of individual species and groups of goods /services on the territory of Ukraine and abroad.
 Services on organization and holding of tenders, calls including electronic.
 Provision of auctioneer services for exchange and open trades.
 Provision of independent, expert and monetary evaluation of the property.
 Providing advice on the above matters.

Performance results 
 During the business year (June 2013 — June 2014) UUE in different directions enclosed more than 3229 exchange agreements on over $3.6 billion UAH.
 According to the State Statistics Committee of Ukraine "On the activities of the exchanges of Ukraine” in 2008-2009 UUE ranked first in terms of trading volumes and was the first in the list of commodity exchanges Accredited by the Ministry of Agrarian Policy by value of transactions for agricultural products, processed products and food.
 UUE occupies the leading places on the volume of sales of coal and agricultural products, unprocessed timber, crude oil, gas condensate and liquefied gas.
 Price indices (quotes) of the UUE used by tax authorities for the purpose of determining transfer prices.
 Ukrainian universal exchange is authorized by the Deposit Guarantee Fund for banks property sale. The Bank collateral property is sold via the electronic trading platform (ETP) of the UUE.
 Amount of sales in January - March 2015:
 Liquefied gas - 289 041 249,58 UAH.
 Condensate - 97 299 197,27 UAH.
 Natural gas - 607 183 031,24 UAH.
 Oil - 128 000,00 UAH.
 Oil products - 30 246 300,00 UAH.

Branches and representational offices 

The Exchange is represented in major economically developed regions of Ukraine: Kiev, Dnepropetrovsk, Zaporizhzhia, Kremenchug, Odesa, Poltava, Sumy, Kharkiv, Kherson and has a large number of offices. Addresses of branches.

Notes

Sources 
 Ukrainian universal exchange — official web-site
 Normative documents of the exchange
 Normative acts
 Licenses
 Diplomas
 Quotes
 Press release for the 1st quarter of 2015
 Ukrainian universal exchange intensively develops electronic exchange trading

References 
 Special LPG auction of “Ukrnafta” and “Ukrgazvydobuvannya” was held ob the UUE
 Ukrmafra’s special gas will be sold on the UUE
 "Ukrgazvydobuvannya" is going to put 12 thousand tons of LPG up for auction
 The court nixed the energy sale auctions outside the UUE
 The court postponed consideration of the UICE claim against the Ministry until September 2, 2014
 What are the reasons for gasoline and diesel fuel to get more expensive?
 The UUE had set the auction on “Ukrnafta’s” energy despite of the court order
 Kurchenko lost court case concerning oil auctions
 Take it or leave it. Yatsenyuk against cheap oil for Kolomoisky
 The economic court of Kyiv obliged “Ukrnafta” and “Ukrgazvydobuvannya” to hold their auctions on the UUE
 The UUE appealed to the Ministry of Energy and Coal and to the Ministry of Economic Development with the request to prevent the exchange’s violation of rights by actions of “Ukrnafta”
 Ukrainian Universal Exchange will hold two special auctions for the sale of liquefied gas for population needs
  Ukrainian Universal Exchange the winner of the Ministry of Energy competition
 Energy produced in Ukraine will be traded on Ukrainian Universal Exchange
 “Ukrgazvydobuvannya” resumed sale of liquefied gas on the UUE
 Ukrainian Universal Exchange – winner of the Ministry of Energy competition Order № 463 dated June 20, 2014
13.10.2015 Ukrgazvudobuvannya on transparent auctions has sold liquefied gas more expensive than Ukrnafta

Ukrainian companies established in 1997
Economy of Ukraine
Stock exchanges in Ukraine
Stock exchanges in Europe
Commodity exchanges by country